Ivan Ivanovich Lepyokhin  (Иван Иванович Лепёхин; , in Saint Petersburg – , in Saint Petersburg) was a Russian naturalist, zoologist, botanist and explorer.

He began his studies in  the Academy of Sciences of Saint-Petersburg  and gained his doctorate at faculty of medicine of the University of Strasbourg.

In 1768 he explored  the Volga region and the  Caspian Sea. In 1769 he went to the Ural mountains which he explored  for five years. In 1774 and 1775 he explored Siberia.

Ivan Lepekhin  was  the Secretary of the Russian Academy since 1783. His extensive journals, revised and completed by Nikolay Ozeretskovsky, were published in 4 hefty volumes between 1771 and 1805.

Lepekhin was in charge of the Saint Petersburg Botanical Garden from 1774 until his death. 

In 1804, his name was honoured in the name Lepechinia from South America, (in the family Lamiaceae) by Carl Ludwig von Willdenow, and then in 1953, Mikhail Grigoríevič Popov published a genus of flowering plants from Central Asia, belonging to the family Boraginaceae as 
Lepechiniella also in his honour.

References

Robert Zander, Fritz Encke, Günther Buchheim, Siegmund Seybold Handwörterbuch der Pflanzennamen. 13. Auflage. Ulmer, Stuttgart 1984, .

Russian ornithologists
18th-century botanists from the Russian Empire
Explorers from the Russian Empire
Members of the Russian Academy
Full members of the Saint Petersburg Academy of Sciences
1740 births
1802 deaths